Solo Live is an album of unaccompanied saxophone and clarinet solos by David Murray recorded live on May 30, 1980 in Nyon, Switzerland. Originally released on the Cecma label as two separate LPs it was re-released as a single CD in 1997.

Reception
The Allmusic review by Scott Yanow awarded the album 3 stars, stating, "Murray, who doubles here on bass clarinet, tears into five of his originals (best known are "Sweet Lovely" and "Flowers for Albert"). The improvising is quite free, exploratory, and sometimes violent, although there are a few strong melodies".

Track listing
 "B.C." – 9:05  
 "Both Feet on the Ground" – 6:27  
 "Rag Tag" – 7:18  
 "Solo #2" – 6:30
 "Untitled" – 5:05
 "Body and Soul" (Eyton, Green, Heyman, Sour) – 8:07  
 "Flowers for Albert" – 5:00  
 "Solo #1" – 7:04 
 "Sweet Lovely" – 7:13   
 "We See" (Monk) – 4:59
All compositions by David Murray except as indicated
Recorded live on May 30, 1980 in Nyon, Switzerland.

Personnel
David Murray – tenor saxophone, bass clarinet

References

1980 live albums
David Murray (saxophonist) live albums